Ramatoulaye Seck was a Senegalese politician.

Alongside Arame Diène and Aïda Mbaye, Seck was elected to the National Assembly in 1983; all three women became known for their political abilities despite a lack of formal education. She was a member of the Socialist Party of Senegal, and was nominated by the local party union as a substitute for Diène, alongside whom she was elected.

References

Year of birth missing
Possibly living people
Members of the National Assembly (Senegal)
20th-century women politicians
Socialist Party of Senegal politicians
Senegalese women in politics